Julie, also known as Julie knew her killer, is the title of a British public information film (PIF) about the importance of wearing a seatbelt in the rear of a car. It ran on national television from 1998 to 2003, and was so successful it was also shown in France, Germany and Australia, as well as being remade by Royal Dutch Shell for broadcast in Libya. 

The safety commercial ran several months each year as part of the "THINK!" campaign, which is run by the Department for Transport, and is listed among the hardest hitting safety adverts of the "last 30 years". The campaign was an "IPA Advertising Effectiveness Award" winner and increased the usage of rear seat belts in the United Kingdom by 11% saving 18 lives per year.

Plot
Julie is driving her two teenage children in a red Vauxhall Cavalier Mark III to school. She and her daughter are wearing their seatbelts, but the young son is not. A voiceover announces "Like most victims, Julie knew her killer." On the screen, we see Julie is so concerned with trying to avoid a Ford Transit Mark II which appears to be tailgating her that she's not concentrating on the road ahead. She crashes into a parked car (Vauxhall Astra Mark II) by the side of the road. 

Her son, who is sitting directly behind her, is thrown forward, killing her instantly as her skull is smashed in by his forehead. The film ends with her lifeless body lying across the wheel. Her daughter is screaming in horror in the front passenger seat. Her son slumps back into his seat with a just bleeding nasal fracture, confused as to what just happened.

Reception
It originally carried the slogan "Belt up in the back. For everyone's sake." and later "Think! Always wear a seatbelt."

Since 5 November 2007, Think! have begun airing the PIF in a shorter, thirty second advert.

References

External links
 Think! - Seatbelts - UK Department for Transport page on seatbelts - "Julie" PIF & others right margin.
  - Video from the preceding link.

1998 films
Public information films
Department for Transport
Automotive safety
1990s educational films
British educational films